Roman Rabl (born in Tyrol in 1991) is an Austrian alpine skier who won three bronze medals at the 2014 Winter Paralympics.

References

Living people
1991 births
Sit-skiers
Austrian male alpine skiers
Paralympic bronze medalists for Austria
Alpine skiers at the 2014 Winter Paralympics
Medalists at the 2018 Winter Paralympics
Medalists at the 2014 Winter Paralympics
Paralympic medalists in alpine skiing
Paralympic alpine skiers of Austria
21st-century Austrian people